Robert Emerson Landsburg (November 13, 1931 – May 18, 1980) was an American photographer who died while photographing the 1980 eruption of Mount St. Helens. He was born in Seattle, Washington, and was a resident of Portland, Oregon, at the time of his death.

In the weeks leading up to the eruption, Landsburg visited the area many times in order to photographically document the changing volcano. On the morning of May 18, he was within a few miles of the summit. When the mountain erupted, Landsburg took photos of the rapidly approaching ash cloud. Before he was engulfed by the pyroclastic flow, he rewound the film back into its case, put his camera in his backpack, and then laid himself on top of the backpack to protect its contents. His body was found 17 days later, buried in the ash with his backpack underneath. The film was developed and has provided geologists with valuable documentation of the historic eruption.

See also 
 List of volcanic eruption deaths

References 

1931 births
1980 deaths
Deaths in volcanic eruptions
Natural disaster deaths in Washington (state)
Photographers from Oregon
Artists from Seattle
Photographers from Washington (state)
Artists from Portland, Oregon
20th-century American photographers